The second season of the television comedy series Community premiered on September 23, 2010 and concluded on May 12, 2011, on NBC. The season consists of 24 episodes and aired on Thursdays at 8:00 pm ET as part of Comedy Night Done Right.

Cast

Starring
Joel McHale as Jeff Winger 
Gillian Jacobs as Britta Perry 
Danny Pudi as Abed Nadir 
Yvette Nicole Brown as Shirley Bennett 
Alison Brie as Annie Edison 
Donald Glover as Troy Barnes 
Ken Jeong as Ben Chang 
Chevy Chase as Pierce Hawthorne

Recurring
Jim Rash as Dean Craig Pelton
Richard Erdman as Leonard Briggs 
Dino Stamatopoulos as Alex "Star-Burns" Osbourne
Erik Charles Nielsen as Garrett Lambert
John Oliver as Professor Ian Duncan 
Danielle Kaplowitz as Vicki Jacobson 
Charley Koontz as Neil 
Luke Youngblood as Magnitude 
Jordan Black as City College Dean Spreck 
Malcolm-Jamal Warner as Andre Bennett 
Greg Cromer as Rich Stephenson
Betty White as June Bauer 
Andy Dick as Helicopter Pilot/Tiny Man 
Kevin Corrigan as Professor Sean Garrity

Guest stars
LeVar Burton as himself ("Intermediate Documentary Filmmaking")
Drew Carey as Ted ("Accounting for Lawyers")
Rob Corddry as Alan Connor ("Accounting for Lawyers")
Eliza Coupe as Special Agent Robin Vohlers ("Intro to Political Science")
Hilary Duff as Meghan ("Aerodynamics of Gender")
Anthony Michael Hall as Mike ("A Fistful of Paintballs")
Josh Holloway as Black Rider ("A Fistful of Paintballs")
Amber Lancaster as Christine ("The Psychology of Letting Go")
Brit Marling as Page ("Early 21st Century Romanticism")
Jerry Minor as Jerry the Janitor ("For a Few Paintballs More")
Tig Notaro as Bartender ("Mixology Certification")
Patton Oswalt as Nurse Jackie ("The Psychology of Letting Go")
Maite Schwartz as Mariah ("Early 21st Century Romanticism")
Stephen Tobolowsky as Professor Sheffield ("Competitive Wine Tasting")
Paul F. Tompkins as Robert ("Mixology Certification")
Matt Walsh as Joshua ("Aerodynamics of Gender")

Episodes

Production
On March 5, 2010, NBC renewed Community for a second season.

Guest stars in the second season of Community include Betty White in the season premiere as June Bauer, an anthropology professor. Drew Carey appeared in the second episode of the season as Ted, the boss from Jeff's old law firm, and Rob Corddry also appeared in the second episode as Alan, Jeff's best friend from his old law firm. Hilary Duff guest starred in the seventh episode as a "mean girl" who's a part of a clique that goes head-to-head with the Greendale study group.

The second season featured a stop-motion animated Christmas episode written by series creator Dan Harmon and Dino Stamatopoulos, who plays Star-Burns in the series. Harmon said, "There's a reason for it to be stop-motion animated, but it's not a dream. It still exists within the reality of the show."

On November 3, 2010, NBC ordered 2 additional episodes for the second season, bringing it to a total of 24 episodes.

The second-season finale was a two-part episode featuring Josh Holloway in a guest appearance. The episodes were a follow-up to the season one episode "Modern Warfare" where the students partake in a campus paintball match.

In the episode "Critical Film Studies", Abed mentions he traveled to Los Angeles to appear in a scene in the television series Cougar Town. In the second-season finale of Cougar Town, Danny Pudi as Abed appears in the background of a scene. Cougar Town actors Dan Byrd and Busy Philipps also appeared briefly in the background of a scene in second-season finale of Community. Cougar Town creator Bill Lawrence explained, "They had Abed have a love of Cougar Town, we had Travis have a love of Community, and once we got wind of what they were having Abed say he experienced out here, we were going to try to find a way of Danny being a background character and essentially act that same thing out on our show." Community previously had an episode that featured several shout-outs to Cougar Town. The mutual admiration between the two shows started as Cougar Town creators Bill Lawrence and Kevin Biegel became friends with Community creator Dan Harmon, and would often tweet each other. Also, Community executive producers Neil Goldman and Garrett Donovan previously worked with Lawrence on Scrubs for several years.

Reception
On Rotten Tomatoes, the season has an approval rating of 100% with an average score of 8.9 out of 10 based on 18 reviews. The website's critical consensus reads, "Community unfurls into a marvel of meta-madness in its sophomore season, artfully deconstructing sitcom tropes while repeatedly knocking its own emotional beats out of the park."

DVD release
The second season of Community was released on region 1 DVD on September 6, 2011, and on region 2 DVD on September 24, 2012. The DVD contains all 24 episodes on four discs plus special features, which include:

Commentary on every episode. Participants include creator Dan Harmon; cast members Joel McHale, Chevy Chase, Danny Pudi, Donald Glover, Ken Jeong, Gillian Jacobs, Yvette Nicole Brown, Jim Rash, Dino Stamatopoulos, Richard Erdman, Rob Corddry, Robert Smigel and Andy Dick; directors Anthony Russo, Joe Russo, Anthony Hemingway, Jay Chandrasekhar, Duke Johnson, Steven Sprung and Tristam Shapeero; writers Chris McKenna, Emily Cutler, Hilary Winston, Andy Bobrow, Adam Countee, Megan Ganz, Andrew Guest and Sona Panos; producers Neil Goldman, Garrett Donovan and Jake Aust; and composer Ludwig Goransson.
Outtakes
Deleted scenes
"The Paintball Finale: From Script to Screen" featurette
"Creating Wonderland" featurette
"Abed's Uncontrollable Christmas" Original Storyboard Animatic
"Abed's Uncontrollable Christmas" In-Process Animatic
Season Two Cast Evaluations
DJ Steve Porter Remixes Season One

References

External links 

 

Community (TV series) seasons
2010 American television seasons
2011 American television seasons